Valentine Augustus Walker (15 February 1890 – 17 March 1969) (also known as Val A Walker and Val Enson) was an English magician, escape artist and illusion designer. He was born in Moseley, Birmingham to Joseph Walker, a landscape gardener, and his wife Emma. Val Walker worked as an electrical apparatus maker, later serving in the Royal Navy and was billed as the "Wizard of the Navy". Walker is credited as the designer of the Radium Girl illusion. His most famous escape was "The Tank in the Thames" where he was bolted into a steel tank lowered into the river Thames from the Sea-Scout Training Ship, Northampton on 20 August 1920. He escaped in 20 seconds. He was married in 1913 to Ethel Dora Harris, the daughter of Thomas Daniel Harris and his wife Emma Ellson. He retired from the stage in 1924, returning briefly in 1939, under the name of 'Val Enson', with an illusion called "The Aquamarine Girl".

References

Further reading
Tad Ware, "The Radium Girl", in Magicol Magazine, pub by Magic Collectors' Association, 2004
Val Walker, written recollections published in Abracadabra magazine in 1968 (full details unavailable)

External links
A picture from the State Library of Victoria, Australia, showing Val Walker in naval uniform.
Discussions about Val Walker on the Genii forum website
 Val Walker site dedicated to his illusions and escapes.
 Val Walker archive on the Flickr site.

1890 births
1969 deaths
English magicians